Shawn Smith is a National Football League (NFL) official. He wears uniform number 14. He entered the league in the  season as an umpire, and was promoted to referee for the  season, following the retirements of Terry McAulay and Gene Steratore. Smith becomes only the sixth African American referee in NFL history, following Johnny Grier, Mike Carey, Jerome Boger, Don Carey and Ronald Torbert. In 2022, he was listed as head referee.

Outside of his NFL duties, Smith works as an internal auditor in Southfield, Michigan.

2022 crew 
 R: Shawn Smith
 U: Bryan Neale
 DJ: Mark Hittner
 LJ: Mike Dolce
 FJ: Dyrol Prioleau
 SJ: Clay Renard
 BJ: Dino Paganelli
 RO: Mike Wimmer
 RA: Sebrina Brunson

References

Living people
National Football League officials
African-American sports officials
Year of birth missing (living people)
Place of birth missing (living people)
21st-century African-American people